Victory Park is a suburb of Johannesburg, South Africa, around 8 km northwest of City Hall.

Victory Park covers 1.6 km², including several smallholdings and a pair of blocks that include the private Jewish high school in the King David Schools network and the Victory Park Hebrew Congregation building. To the north is Delta Park in Blairgowrie, to the northeast is Craighall Park, to the east is Parkhurst, to the southeast is Greenside, to the southwest is Emmarentia, and to the west is Linden. In the old municipal borders, Victory Park was part of Johannesburg and separated by Linden from Randburg.

Victory Park was founded on Braamfontein Farm in January 1919. The name was in honor of the Allied victory in World War I.

Sources 
 Raper, Peter Edmund (2004). New Dictionary of South African Place Names. Johannesburg/Cape Town: Jonathan Ball Publishers.
 Stals, Prof. Dr. E.L.P (ed.) (1978). Afrikaners in die Goudstad, vol. 1: 1886 - 1924. Cape Town/Pretoria: HAUM.

References 

Suburbs of Johannesburg